Alan Messer (born 1951) is a British photographer originally from Kent, known for his photographs of musicians. Messer bought his first camera in 1958, a Kodak Brownie 127; he wanted to document his family and the environment around the south east coast of England where he grew up. Messer met his future employer, when his father hired the then famous music photographer Dezo Hoffmann, to photograph boys' clothes that he made in his tailoring, Alan and his brothers were the models.

Messer did not like school, and in 1967 he got a job at Dezo Hoffmann's studio in London. One week later, he was an assistant in a photo shoot of Jimi Hendrix for a newspaper cover. Within a few weeks, he had a front page of Manfred Mann, who marketed their new single "Mighty Quinn", and then in 1968 The Beatles who posed for their film campaign for Yellow Submarine.

During the 1970s, Messer photographed many famous bands and artists in his studio in London. In 1978, he moved to Nashville and opened a studio, where he continues to photograph musicians, including Johnny Cash.

References

External links
Alan Messer's website.

1951 births
20th-century British photographers
Living people
British photographers
Rock music photographers